The 1897 Chicago dental Infirmary football team was an American football team that represented the Chicago Dental Infirmary in the 1897 college football season. The Dents, as they were occasionally known, compiled a 2–2–1, and were outscored by their opponents 97 to 48, with a majority of the lost points coming at the hands of Notre Dame, who shut them out 62–0.  In a game for the unofficial title of "Western Dental college champion", Chicago Dental lost 0–14 to Northwestern University Dental department.

Schedule

References

Chicago Dental Infirmary
Chicago Dental Infirmary football seasons
Chicago Dental Infirmary Football